Hempfest may refer to:
 Emerald Empire Hempfest, held annually in Eugene, Oregon, since 2003
 Great Midwest Marijuana Harvest Festival, also called Harvestfest, or Hempfest, held annually in Madison since 1971
 Missoula Hempfest, held annually since 1996
 Moscow Hemp Fest, Idaho event held annually since 1996
 Olympia Hempfest, held annually since 2004
 Salem Hempfest, held annually since 2015
 Seattle Hempfest, held annually since 1991